My Little Television is a South Korean television program which has been broadcast since February 2015, and features personal internet broadcasting similar to the likes of afreecaTV, Twitch or Daum tvPot. This program is inspired by real-time streaming services. It is a program that values communication with viewers. The program is hosted by Seo Yu-ri. The program is formatted in the form of a competition between main casts based on their internet broadcasting performance. It airs on KakaoTV (Raw live broadcasting of 'channels' of main casts/random time on Sundays (KST) every 2 weeks), as well as on MBC (Every Saturday at 23:15) since the beginning of April 25, 2015. The first season finished on June 10, 2017 with 101 episodes aired and 50 shows streamed online.

Season 2 of the program, My Little Television V2, began airing on March 29, 2019 and ended on January 20, 2020.

List of episodes

2015

 Internet Broadcast (Live) : February 8, 2015
 TV Broadcast: February 22 & 28, 2015

 Internet Broadcast (Live) : April 12, 2015
 TV Broadcast: April 25 & May 2, 2015

 Internet Broadcast (Live) : May 3, 2015
 TV Broadcast: May 9 & 16, 2015

 Internet Broadcast (Live) : May 17, 2015
 TV Broadcast: May 23 & 30, 2015

 Internet Broadcast (Live) : May 31, 2015
 TV Broadcast: June 6 & 13, 2015

 Internet Broadcast (Live) : June 14, 2015
 TV Broadcast: June 20 & 27, 2015
 Location: Jebu Island

 Internet Broadcast (Live) : June 28, 2015
 TV Broadcast: July 4 & 11, 2015

 Internet Broadcast (Live) : July 12, 2015
 TV Broadcast: July 18 & 25, 2015

 Internet Broadcast (Live) : July 26, 2015
 TV Broadcast: August 1 & 8, 2015

 Internet Broadcast (Live) : August 9, 2015
 TV Broadcast: August 15 & 22, 2015

 Internet Broadcast (Live) : August 23, 2015
 TV Broadcast: August 29 & September 12, 2015

 Internet Broadcast (Live) : September 13, 2015
 TV Broadcast: September 19 & 26, 2015

 Internet Broadcast (Live) : September 29, 2015
 TV Broadcast: October 3 & 10, 2015

 Internet Broadcast (Live) : October 11, 2015
 TV Broadcast: October 17 & 24, 2015

 Internet Broadcast (Live) : October 25, 2015
 TV Broadcast: October 31 & November 7, 2015

 Internet Broadcast (Live) : November 8, 2015
 TV Broadcast: November 14 & 21, 2015

 Internet Broadcast (Live) : November 22, 2015
 TV Broadcast: November 28 & December 5, 2015

 Internet Broadcast (Live) : December 6, 2015
 TV Broadcast: December 12 & 19, 2015

 Internet Broadcast (Live) : December 20, 2015
 TV Broadcast: December 26 & January 2, 2016

2016

 Internet Broadcast (Live) : January 3, 2016
 TV Broadcast: January 9 & 16, 2016

 Internet Broadcast (Live) : January 17, 2016
 TV Broadcast: February 6 & 13, 2016

 Internet Broadcast (Live) : February 14, 2016
 TV Broadcast: February 20 & 27, 2016

 Internet Broadcast (Live) : February 28, 2016
 TV Broadcast: March 5 & 12, 2016

 Internet Broadcast (Live) : March 13, 2016
 TV Broadcast: March 19 & 26, 2016

 Internet Broadcast (Live) : March 27, 2016
 TV Broadcast: April 2 & 9, 2016

 Internet Broadcast (Live) : April 10, 2016
 TV Broadcast: April 16 & 23, 2016

 Internet Broadcast (Live) : April 24, 2016
 TV Broadcast: April 30 & May 7, 2016

 Internet Broadcast (Live) : May 8, 2016
 TV Broadcast: May 14 & 21, 2016

 Internet Broadcast (Live) : May 22, 2016
 TV Broadcast: May 28 & June 4, 2016

 Internet Broadcast (Live) : June 5, 2016
 TV Broadcast: June 11 & 18, 2016

* For MLT-29, Lee Kyung-kyu did a live candid camera prank. The broadcast topic was made out to be Musikdrama, as the subject of the prank was known to watch the live internet broadcasts of the show.

 Internet Broadcast (Live) : June 19, 2016
 TV Broadcast: June 25 & July 2, 2016

 Internet Broadcast (Live) : July 3, 2016
 TV Broadcast: July 9 & 16, 2016

 Internet Broadcast (Live) : July 17, 2016
 TV Broadcast: July 23 & 30, 2016

 Internet Broadcast (Live) : July 31, 2016
 TV Broadcast: August 27 & September 3, 2016

The TV broadcast of MLT-33 was postponed because of the 2016 Summer Olympics.

 Internet Broadcast (Live) : September 4, 2016
 TV Broadcast: September 10 & 17, 2016

 Internet Broadcast (Live) : September 18, 2016
 TV Broadcast: September 24 & October 8, 2016

 Internet Broadcast (Live) : October 9, 2016
 TV Broadcast: October 15 & 22, 2016

 Internet Broadcast (Live) : October 23, 2016
 TV Broadcast: October 29 & November 5, 2016

 Internet Broadcast (Live) : November 6, 2016
 TV Broadcast: November 12 & November 19, 2016

 Internet Broadcast (Live) : November 21, 2016
 TV Broadcast: November 26 & December 3, 2016

 Internet Broadcast (Live) : December 4, 2016
 TV Broadcast: December 10, 17 & 24, 2016
 Collaboration special

2017

 Internet Broadcast (Live) : January 1, 2017
 TV Broadcast: January 7 & 14, 2017
 The number of broadcasting channels is reduced to four from this episode.

 Internet Broadcast (Live) : January 15, 2017
 TV Broadcast: January 21 & February 4, 2017

 Internet Broadcast (Live) : February 5, 2017
 TV Broadcast: February 11 & 18, 2017

 Internet Broadcast (Live) : February 19, 2017
 TV Broadcast: February 25 & March 4, 2017

 Internet Broadcast (Live) : March 5, 2017
 TV Broadcast: March 11 & 18, 2017

 Internet Broadcast (Live) : March 19, 2017
 TV Broadcast: March 25 & April 1, 2017

 Internet Broadcast (Live) : April 2, 2017
 TV Broadcast: April 8 & 15, 2017

 Internet Broadcast (Live) : April 16, 2017
 TV Broadcast: April 22 & May 13, 2017

 Internet Broadcast (Live) : May 14, 2017
 TV Broadcast: May 20 & 27, 2017

 Internet Broadcast (Live) : May 28, 2017
 TV Broadcast: June 3 & 10, 2017
 My Little Television Season 1 Finale Episode
 Miss MLT's master is revealed to be Kim Gura

Ratings
In the ratings below, the highest rating for the show will be in red, and the lowest rating for the show will be in blue each year.

Ratings (2015-16)

Ratings (2017)

International versions
 Currently airing
 An upcoming season
 No longer airing

Controversies

Flag incident
In November 2015, girl group Twice appeared on the show, and Taiwanese member Tzuyu introduced herself as Taiwanese and held the ROC flag alongside that of South Korea. The Japanese flag was also shown, representing the nationalities of the girl group members.

Initially there were no reactions to the incident, but after the Taiwanese-born, China-based singer Huang An took to his Sina Weibo account and accused Tzuyu of being a Taiwanese independence activist. This led to internet users in Mainland China to react angrily towards Tzuyu's actions, accusing her of "profiting from her mainland Chinese audience while holding a pro-independence stance". Soon after, Twice was barred from Chinese television, Tzuyu was pulled out from her endorsement deal with Chinese communications corporation Huawei, and all her activities in China were suspended.

On January 15, 2016, the day before the Taiwanese general election, the CEO of JYP Entertainment, Park Jin-young apologized to Chinese media through his Weibo account, and JYP released a video of Tzuyu reading an apology, which included the statement:

Effects
As many believed the statement was made under duress, the apology video infuriated the Taiwanese public on election day. The incident gained international attention as it was believed to have affected the 2016 Taiwanese general election, which was won by Tsai Ing-wen and the pro-independence DPP by a wide margin. While the DPP were already leading the polls months prior to the election, a survey found that Tzuyu's video apology affected the decision of about 1.34 million young voters, either by swaying them to vote or change their votes. Scholars believe that the incident probably contributed one or two percentage points to Tsai's winning margin.

Notes

References

External links
 
Official web broadcasting of raw internet broadcasting 'channels'  (requires PotPlayer for interacting with casts via chat)
Most recent info gathered by Korean netizens  (CCL 2.0 BY-NC-SA South Korea, one of anomious editors is Production designer of this program)
Ratings (table format is ||Episodes on TV||B.Date on TV||Episodes and B.Date on the Internet||Main Casts||Guests||Nationwide||SNCA||)
Casts and Records

2015 South Korean television series debuts
Korean-language television shows
MBC TV original programming
South Korean variety television shows
South Korean reality television series